Gary Cooper (25 November 1938 – 18 August 2019), also known by the nickname of "Super Duper" Gary Cooper, was an English professional rugby league footballer who played in the 1950s, 1960s and 1970s, and coached in the 1970s.

Background 
Gary Cooper was born in Castleford, West Riding of Yorkshire, England, he died aged 80 from a myocardial infarction (heart attack), and his funeral will take place at All Saints Church, North Featherstone at 1:15pm on Thursday 12 September 2019, followed a reception at Featherstone Rovers Clubhouse.

Playing career

International honours 
Gary Cooper was selected for Great Britain while at Featherstone Rovers for the 1962 Great Britain Lions tour of Australia and New Zealand, during which he played 16 non-Test matches.

Championship final appearances 
Gary Cooper played  in Wakefield Trinity's 21–9 victory over St. Helens in the Championship Final replay during the 1966–67 season at Station Road, Swinton on Wednesday 10 May 1967, and was man of the match winning the Harry Sunderland Trophy in the 17–10 victory over Hull Kingston Rovers in the Championship Final during the 1967–68 season at Headingley, Leeds on Saturday 4 May 1968.

Challenge Cup Final appearances 
Gary Cooper played  in Wakefield Trinity's 10–11 defeat by Leeds in the 1968 Challenge Cup "Watersplash" Final during the 1967–68 season at Wembley Stadium, London on Saturday 11 May 1968, in front of a crowd of 87,100.

Club career 
Gary Cooper made his début for Featherstone Rovers on Wednesday 20 August 1958, and he played his last match for Featherstone Rovers during the 1965–66 season, he appears to have scored no drop-goals (or field-goals as they are currently known in Australasia), but prior to the 1974–75 season all goals, whether; conversions, penalties, or drop-goals, scored 2-points, consequently prior to this date drop-goals were often not explicitly documented, therefore "0" drop-goals may indicate drop-goals not recorded, rather than no drop-goals scored.

Coaching career

Club career 
Gary Cooper was the Assistant Coach in York's 5–32 defeat by St. Helens in the 1971–72 Challenge Cup quarter-final match during the 1971–72 season at Clarence Street, York on Saturday 4 March 1972.

Genealogical information 
Gary Cooper was the older brother of the rugby league footballer who played in the 1960s and 1970s for Wakefield Trinity (Heritage No. 728); Brian Cooper (birth registered fourth ¼ 1940), Colin Cooper (birth registered first ¼ 1946), the rugby league executive (former chairperson of Hull F.C.); Kath M. Hetherington (née Cooper, birth registered second ¼ 1952), and the brother-in-law of her husband the rugby league player, coach and executive; Gary Hetherington, and the older brother of rugby league footballer who played in the 1970s for York and Wakefield Trinity (A-Team); Stephen "Steve" Cooper (birth registered fourth ¼ 1953).

References

External links 
Gary Cooper
June 2013
Rugby Cup Final 1968

1938 births
2019 deaths
English rugby league coaches
English rugby league players
Featherstone Rovers captains
Featherstone Rovers players
Great Britain national rugby league team players
Rugby league centres
Rugby league fullbacks
Rugby league players from Castleford
Wakefield Trinity players
York Wasps coaches